William Nelson, 1st Earl Nelson, 2nd Duke of Bronte (20 April 1757 – 28 February 1835), was an Anglican clergyman and an older brother of Horatio Nelson, 1st Viscount Nelson.

Life
Born in Burnham Thorpe, he was a son of the Reverend Edmund Nelson (1722–1802), and the Nelson family had been settled in Norfolk for many generations. The Reverend Edmund Nelson was Rector of Hillborough and of Burnham Thorpe in that county and married Catherine Suckling, whose maternal grandmother Mary was the sister of Robert Walpole and of Horatio Walpole, 1st Baron Walpole of Wolterton. Their fifth but third-surviving son was the renowned naval commander Horatio Nelson.

He was educated at Christ's College, Cambridge, matriculating in 1774, graduating B.A. 1778, M.A. 1781, D.D. 1802. He was ordained deacon in 1779 and priest in 1781.

He became rector of Brandon Parva in Norfolk in January 1784, and went to sea that year as a naval chaplain on the HMS Boreas (commanded by his brother the future Admiral), but obtained his discharge in October 1786 and returned to Brandon Parva. He became rector of Hilborough in 1797, and a prebendary of Canterbury Cathedral in 1803.

William Nelson succeeded by a special remainder, which included his father's and sisters' male issue, to one of Horatio Nelson's baronies (Baron Nelson, of the Nile and of Hilborough in the County of Norfolk, created in 1801) upon the latter's death at the Battle of Trafalgar on 21 October 1805, as well as to the dukedom of Bronte, of the Kingdom of the Two Sicilies. A month later, on 20 November 1805, in honour of his late brother's achievements, he was created Earl Nelson and Viscount Merton, both of Trafalgar and of Merton in the County of Surrey, again with a special remainder including the male issue of his sisters.

He was reportedly an ambitious man, and used Nelson's mistress Emma Hamilton's generosity and hospitality when it served his purpose, including hosting his son Horatio at her home during the Eton school holidays, but cut both her and Horatia Nelson, Emma's daughter by Lord Nelson, off after Nelson's death. He did not respect his brother's wishes to look after Horatia.

He moved to Trafalgar Park after Standlynch Park was renamed thus by an Act of Parliament in 1814.

He died without surviving male issue, Horatio (recently made Viscount Trafalgar) having died at the age of 19 of tuberculosis in 1808, and all of his British titles passed to Thomas Bolton, the son of his sister Susannah. The Sicilian dukedom of Bronte passed to his daughter Charlotte, wife of Samuel Hood, 2nd Baron Bridport.

There is a memorial to him in the crypt at St Paul's Cathedral.

Family
Nelson married firstly Sarah Yonge, daughter of Rev. Henry Yonge, on 9 November 1786. They had two children:
 Charlotte Mary Nelson (1787–1873), 3rd Duchess of Bronte, married Samuel Hood, 2nd Baron Bridport
 Horatio Nelson (1788–1808), styled Viscount Merton and Viscount Trafalgar

After Sarah's death on 13 April 1828, at the age of 71, Nelson married the much younger Hilare Barlow, daughter of Admiral Sir Robert Barlow, on 26 March 1829.

References

External links

|-

Nelson, William Nelson, 1st Earl
People from King's Lynn and West Norfolk (district)
Nelson, William Nelson, 1st Earl
Nelson, William Nelson, 1st Earl
Alumni of Christ's College, Cambridge
Horatio Nelson
Earls Nelson